The Linois class comprised three protected cruisers of the French Navy built in the early 1890s; the three ships were , , and . They were ordered as part of a naval construction program directed at France's rivals, Italy and Germany, particularly after Italy made progress in modernizing its own fleet. The plan was also intended to remedy a deficiency in cruisers that had been revealed during training exercises in the 1880s. As such, the Linois-class cruisers were intended to operate as fleet scouts and in the French colonial empire.

All three members of the class served with the Mediterranean Squadron upon entering service in the mid-to-late 1890s. During this period, they were primarily occupied with peacetime training maneuvers. Lavoisier was transferred to the Newfoundland and Iceland Naval Division in 1903, where she patrolled fisheries for the next decade. After uneventful careers, Linois and Galilée were discarded in 1910 and 1911, respectively, having spent less than fifteen years in service. Lavoisier was the only member of the class still in commission at the start of World War I in August 1914, and she was used to patrol for German warships and submarines in various secondary theaters, ending the war in the Syrian Naval Division, where she remained through the end of the war. She was ultimately struck from the naval register in 1920 and thereafter broken up.

Design

These developments provoked a strong response in the French press. The Budget Committee in the French Chamber of Deputies began to press for a "two-power standard" in 1888, which would see the French fleet enlarged to equal the combined Italian and German fleets, then France's two main rivals on the continent. This initially came to nothing, as the supporters of the  doctrine called for a fleet largely based on squadrons of torpedo boats to defend the French coasts rather than an expensive fleet of ironclads. This view had significant support in the Chamber of Deputies.

The next year, a war scare with Italy led to further outcry to strengthen the fleet. To compound matters, the visit of a German squadron of four ironclads to Italy confirmed French concerns of a combined Italo-German fleet that would dramatically outnumber their own. Training exercises held in France that year demonstrated that the slower French fleet would be unable to prevent the faster Italian squadron from bombarding the French coast at will, in part because it lacked enough cruisers (and doctrine to use them) to scout for the enemy ships.

To correct the weaknesses of the French fleet, on 22 November 1890, the Superior Council authorized a new construction program directed not at simple parity with the Italian and German fleets, but numerical superiority. In addition to twenty-four new battleships, a total of seventy cruisers were to be built for use in home waters and overseas in the French colonial empire. The Linois class were ordered as part of the program, and their design was based on the earlier , albeit with increased freeboard.

General characteristics and machinery

They displaced . Like most French warships of the period, the Linois-class cruisers' hulls had a pronounced ram bow and tumblehome shape. They also had a short forecastle deck , and the hulls included a double bottom. The ships had a minimal superstructure, with a small conning tower and a bridge forward and a smaller, secondary bridge aft. They were fitted with pole masts with spotting tops for observation and signaling purposes. Their crew varied over the course of their careers, amounting to 250–269 officers and enlisted men.

The ships' propulsion system consisted of a pair of vertical triple-expansion steam engines driving two screw propellers. Steam was provided by six coal-burning fire-tube boilers for Linois, while the other two vessels received sixteen coal-fired, Belleville-type water-tube boilers. All of the ships' boiler rooms were ducted into two funnels.

Armament and armor

The ships were armed with a main battery of four  45-caliber guns in individual pivot mounts with gun shields, all in sponsons located amidships with two guns per broadside. These were probably the M1893 variant installed without trunnions. The forward pair were placed just abaft the conning tower and the after pair were between the aft funnel and the main mast. The main battery was supported by a secondary battery that consisted of a pair of  Modèle 1891 guns, one at the bow and the other at the stern, which were also fitted with shields.

For close-range defense against torpedo boats, they carried eight  3-pounder Hotchkiss guns, two  guns, and four 37 mm Hotchkiss revolver cannon. These were carried in individual pivot mounts and they were distributed along the length of the ship to provide wide fields of fire. All three ships were also armed with four  torpedo tubes in their hull above the waterline. Linois and Galilée had provisions to carry up to 120 naval mines.

Above the deck at the sides, a cofferdam filled with cellulose was intended to contain flooding from damage below the waterline. Below the main deck, a thin splinter deck covered the propulsion machinery spaces to protect them from shell fragments.

Construction

Service history

Linois was assigned to the Mediterranean Squadron in 1896, where she was joined by Galilée and Lavoisier in 1898. The three ships served as part of the cruiser force of the main French battle fleet. They took part in training exercises during this period, which sometimes included joint maneuvers with the Northern Squadron, along with shooting practice and naval reviews. Linois was involved in a show of force meant to intimidate the Ottoman Empire in 1902 during a period of tension with France. Lavoisier was transferred to the Newfoundland and Iceland Naval Division in 1903, where she patrolled fishing grounds off the coast of Newfoundland. Linois remained in service with the Mediterranean Squadron through 1905. During a review in 1909, Galilée hosted President Armand Fallières and Tsar Nicholas II of Russia during the latter's visit to France. Linois was struck from the naval register in 1910, thereafter being broken up for scrap. Galilée was discarded the following year.
 
Lavoisier was attached to the 2nd Light Squadron in the English Channel at the start of World War I in August 1914, but she saw no action there. She was transferred to the eastern Mediterranean in December 1915, operated briefly with the main French fleet, and then conducted anti-submarine patrols in the western Mediterranean. In 1917, she returned to the Moroccan Naval Division, and the following year, she was reassigned to the Syrian Naval Division, where she remained through the end of the war. In April 1919, Lavoisier was detached from the Syrian Division; decommissioned for the last time in August, she was struck from the naval register in early 1920 and sold to ship breakers.

Citations

References

 
 
 
 
 
 
 
 
 
 
 
 
 
 

 
Cruiser classes
Ships built in France
Ship classes of the French Navy